Callum Reid may refer to:

 Callum Reid (rugby union, born 1992), Scottish rugby union and rugby sevens player 
 Callum Reid (rugby union, born 1999), Irish rugby union player